Urbain Some(born 20 February 1979) is a Burkinabé former international football midfielder and head coach who played in the Burkinabé Premier League, Canadian Professional Soccer League, and the USL First Division. He is currently the president and co-founder of the Planet Soccer Academy.

Playing career
Some began his professional career in his native Burkina Faso in the Burkinabé Premier League with Union Sportive des Forces Armées, with the club he won league titles in 1998, and 2000. In 2002, he went abroad to play with the Ottawa Wizards in the Canadian Professional Soccer League. In his debut season with Ottawa he assisted in securing the league treble (CPSL Championship, CPSL Canada Cup, and the Eastern Conference title). The following season he returned to the Wizards and helped the club to an undefeated season, but the club withdrew from the postseason after a dispute with the CPSL board of directors. In 2004, he played with Ottawa St. Anthony Italia in the Ottawa-Carleton Soccer League, and featured in the 2004 Open Canada Cup.

In 2005, he was signed by the Toronto Lynx of the USL First Division by his former Wizards head coach Hubert Busby, Jr., who signed him due to a shortage of players from injuries and suspensions. He made his debut for the club in the home opener against the Montreal Impact. He scored his first goal for the club on 31 May 2005 in a match against the Rochester Rhinos in 5–3 defeat.  In 2006, he returned to Ottawa St. Anthony Italia, and was named the team captain. Throughout the season he contributed in securing the Ontario Cup, and the Canadian National Challenge Cup. He managed to win his second Open Canada Cup by defeating his former club the Toronto Lynx in a 2–0 victory over the professional club.

International career
Some played for the Burkina Faso national football team in 1998, where he made his international debut in a match against Guinea in a World cup qualifier match.

Managerial career 
In 2007, he was named the head coach for the Université du Québec en Outaouais men's team, and in 2008 he served as the women's head coach for the university. He also formed the Planet Soccer Academy with Marc-Cyrille Kamdem in 2012.

Honors

USFA Ouagadougou
 Burkinabé Premier League Champions (2): 1998, 2000

Ottawa Wizards
 CPSL Championship (1): 2002
 CPSL Canada Cup (1): 2002
 CPSL Eastern Conference title (2): 2002, 2003

Ottawa St. Anthony Italia
 Canadian National Challenge Cup (1): 2006
 Ontario Cup (1): 2006 
 Open Canada Cup (1): 2006

References

1979 births
Living people
Association football midfielders
Burkinabé footballers
Burkinabé expatriate footballers
Burkina Faso international footballers
Canadian Soccer League (1998–present) players
Ottawa Wizards players
Toronto Lynx players
USL First Division players
US des Forces Armées players
Expatriate soccer players in Canada
Burkinabé expatriate sportspeople in Canada
Burkinabé football managers
21st-century Burkinabé people